George Yull Mackie, Baron Mackie of Benshie   (10 July 1919 – 17 February 2015) was a British Liberal Party politician.

Mackie was commissioned in the Royal Air Force Volunteer Reserve in 1940. He served with RAF Bomber Command and was awarded the Distinguished Service Order and Distinguished Flying Cross. After the Second World War, he took over a farm at Benshie, Angus, and subsequently set up a cattle ranch at Braeroy, Inverness-shire, near Spean Bridge. Having first contested South Angus in 1959, he was elected Member of Parliament for Caithness and Sutherland in 1964. In the Commons he served as Scottish Liberal whip. He lost his seat in 1966, when he was defeated by Labour candidate Robert Maclennan.  Maclennan eventually became a senior Social Democrat Party/Liberal Democrat politician in the 1980s. Mackie contested Caithness and Sutherland again in 1970, but lost by a wider margin.

Having been appointed a Commander of the Order of the British Empire (CBE) in 1971, he was given a life peerage, as Baron Mackie of Benshie, of Kirriemuir in the County of Angus on 10 May 1974. In the House of Lords, he served as Agriculture and Scottish Affairs spokesman for the Liberals and their successor parties between 1975 and 2000. Having been Chair of the Scottish Liberal Party from 1965 to 1970, he was its president between 1983 and 1988. In 1980, he was elected to serve a term as Rector of the University of Dundee.

His older brothers were Sir Maitland Mackie and John Mackie, Baron John-Mackie.

Until his death, Mackie was the oldest living person to have served as a Liberal Member of Parliament in the United Kingdom. His death was announced on 17 February 2015. He was 95 years old.

Lord Mackie's papers are held by Archive Services at the University of Dundee.

Mackie married firstly, in 1944, Lindsay, daughter of lawyer Alexander Sharp, of Aberdeen. They had three daughters, the eldest of whom, Lindsay, married the journalist Alan Rusbridger. Mackie married secondly, in 1988, Jacqueline, daughter of Colonel Marcel Rauch, of the French Air Force.

Sources
 Parliament.uk Biography, parliament.uk; accessed 15 November 2015.

References

External links 
 

1919 births
2015 deaths
Mackie of Benshie
Mackie of Benshie, George
Members of the Parliament of the United Kingdom for Highland constituencies
Royal Air Force Volunteer Reserve personnel of World War II
Scottish farmers
Scottish Liberal Party MPs
UK MPs 1964–1966
UK MPs who were granted peerages
Royal Air Force squadron leaders
Life peers created by Elizabeth II